Artur Soares Correia (born 15 March 1955), known simply as Artur, is a Portuguese former footballer who played as a defender.

He gained 1 cap for Portugal, appearing in a friendly against Spain on 26 September 1979.

References

External links 
 

1955 births
Living people
Portuguese footballers
Association football defenders
Primeira Liga players
S.C. Braga players
S.C. Espinho players
Portugal international footballers
Portugal B international footballers
Sportspeople from Braga